Bolanos may refer to:

 Bolanos River, island of Guam
 Mount Bolanos, near Umatac, island of Guam

Or to:

 Bolaños River, in Mexico
 Bolaños Municipality, a municipality in Mexico

See also
 Bolaños (disambiguation)